Arlen Lovera (born ) is a retired Venezuelan female artistic gymnast, representing her nation at international competitions.

She participated at the 2000 Summer Olympics.

References

External links
Arlen Lovera at Sports Reference
http://assets.espn.go.com/oly/summer00/results/wgymnastics1.html
http://s35.photobucket.com/user/gymnstands/media/2000%20Olympics/lovera.jpg.html

1984 births
Living people
Venezuelan female artistic gymnasts
Place of birth missing (living people)
Gymnasts at the 2000 Summer Olympics
Olympic gymnasts of Venezuela
Gymnasts at the 1999 Pan American Games
Pan American Games competitors for Venezuela
20th-century Venezuelan women
21st-century Venezuelan women